The Great Raid of 1840  was the largest raid ever mounted by Native Americans on white cities in what is now the United States. It followed the Council House Fight, in which Republic of Texas officials attempted to capture and take prisoner 33 Comanche chiefs who had come to negotiate a peace treaty, killing them together with two dozen of their family and followers. The Comanche tribe was supposed to have brought white hostages as their part of the negotiations but only brought one young woman (the 16-year-old Matilda Lockhart). Arguments and fighting then broke out among the Texans and Comanches.  The Texas Officials were determined to force the Comanche to release all white captives among them. To avenge what the Comanche viewed as a bitter betrayal by the Texans, the Comanche war chief Buffalo Hump raised a huge war party of many of the bands of the Comanche, and raided deep into white-settled areas of Southeast Texas.

Buffalo Hump gathers the tribes

Penateka first war chief Buffalo Hump was determined to do more than merely complain about what the Comanches viewed as a bitter betrayal. Spreading word to the other bands of Comanches that he was raiding the white settlements in revenge, Buffalo Hump led the Great Raid of 1840. Buffalo Hump, Penateka second war chief Yellow Wolf, Penateka third war chief Santa Anna and Isimanica gathered a huge Penateka raiding party, at least 400 warriors, with (maybe 500) wives and young boys along to provide comfort and do the work and, in the summer, raided the settlements between Bastrop and San Antonio. In mid-July they were ready and Comanches from every division (Nokoni, Kotsoteka, Yamparika and Kwahadi) were roaming through Texas. Altogether as many as a thousand Comanche may have set out from West Texas on the Great Raid. On this raid the Comanches went all the way from the plains of west Texas to the cities of Victoria and Linnville on the Texas coast. In what may have been the largest organized raid by the Comanches to that point, they raided and burned these towns and plundered at will.

Victoria
The huge war party crossed into central Texas and first attacked the town of Victoria, August 6, 1840. Although rangers had found the tracks of a gigantic war party coming out of West Texas, and were shadowing the onrushing Comanches, part of the war party broke off and attacked Victoria before the citizens could be warned. One resident wrote, "We of Victoria were startled by the apparitions presented by the sudden appearance of six hundred mounted Comanches in the immediate outskirts of the village." The citizens of Victoria hid in the buildings, and the Comanches, after killing a dozen or so townspeople and riding up and down, departed Victoria when rifle fire from the buildings began to make the riding dangerous. The war party intended to gather horses and loot the coastal towns, which were not as prepared for the Comanches as the central Texas cities. After the attack on Victoria, the Comanches camped the night of August 6 on nearby Spring Creek.

The Sack of Linnville

Leaving Victoria August 7, 1840, the Comanches continued on toward Linnville camping the night on Placido (now Placedo) Creek on the ranch of Plácido Benavides, about twelve miles from Linnville.

Early August 8, 1840, the Comanches surrounded the small port of Linnville, Texas, which was the second largest port in the Republic of Texas at the time, and began pillaging the stores and houses. Linnville, of which nothing remains, was located 3.5 miles northeast of present-day Port Lavaca. The Comanches reportedly killed three whites, including customs officer Hugh Oran Watts, who had delayed his escape to retrieve a gold watch at his home (reportedly a family heirloom). After killing Watts, the Comanche captured his wife of only three weeks, the former Juliet Constance, and a black woman and child.

Realizing that the plains Indians would have no experience on water, the townspeople fled prudently from the Comanche raiders to the safety of the water. They were saved by remaining aboard small boats and a schooner captained by William G. Marshall, which was at anchor in the bay. While safe in the water, the refugees witnessed the destruction and looting of their town, unable to do a thing except curse them.

For that entire day the Comanches plundered and burned buildings, draping themselves grandly in top hats and stolen linens. They tied feather beds and bolts of cloth to their horses, and dragged them. They herded large numbers of cattle into pens and slaughtered them. One outraged citizen, Judge John Hays, grabbed a gun and waded ashore through the shallow water, and roared at the bemused warriors, but the Indians chose to spare him, believing him mad. He later found that he had waded ashore to face nearly a thousand Indians with an unloaded pistol.

At the time of the Great Raid, many trade goods were en route from overseas to New Orleans, Louisiana to San Antonio, Texas and Austin, Texas; a total inventory valued at over $300,000 was reported to be at Linnville at that moment, including an undisclosed amount of silver bullion. Linn noted that in addition to the cloth and other trade goods usually present in his warehouse at that time were several cases of hats and umbrellas belonging to James Robinson, a San Antonio merchant. "These the Indians made free with, and went dashing about the blazing village, amid their screeching squaws and `little Injuns,' like demons in a drunken saturnalia, with Robinson's hats on their heads and Robinson's umbrellas bobbing about on every side like tipsy young balloons." After loading loot onto pack mules, the raiders, finally began their retreat on the afternoon on August 8, 1840.

The Battle of Plum Creek

The Rangers had been trailing the war party for some time, unable to engage them because of their sheer numbers. But the three days of looting at Linnville gave the militia and Ranger companies a chance to gather. Volunteers from Gonzales, Texas, under Mathew Caldwell and from Bastrop under Ed Burleson, with all the ranger companies of east and central Texas, moved to intercept the Indians. They made contact at Plum Creek, near the city of Lockhart, Texas, on August 12, 1840. The Comanches, who normally fared about as a fast and deadly light cavalry, were detained considerably by the captive, slower pack mules. The normal Comanche tactic was to ride as fast as possible away from the scene of a victory, but on this occasion they slowed to a gentler pace acceptable to the heavily laden pack mules. Thus, the militia and rangers caught the raiders, which normally they found impossible. The battle of Plum Creek was really a running gun battle, where the Texans attempted to kill the raiders and recover loot, and the Indians simply attempted to get away. Although only a dozen bodies were recovered, the Texans reported killing 80 Comanches, and the war party losses were probably higher than normal. But greed saved the Comanches in turn; when the militia discovered the stolen bullion, they abandoned the fight, divided their loot, and went home.

Conclusion
The Great Raid of 1840 was the largest Indian raid on White cities in the history of what is now the United States—though technically when it occurred it was in the Republic of Texas and not in the United States. The war party burned one city to the ground. Their total plunder included over 3,000 horses and mules as well as hundreds of thousands of dollars of other items ranging from silver to cloth and mirrors. The sheer volume of loot slowed them down and made them vulnerable to attack from a militia that otherwise would have never caught them. The militia concentrated on seizing and dividing the recovered bullion and other plunder rather than pursue the raiding party.

See also
 List of battles won by Indigenous peoples of the Americas
Buffalo Hump
Yellow Wolf (Comanche)
Santa Anna (Comanche war chief)
Council House Fight
Battle of Plum Creek

Notes

References

Online sources
 Handbook of Texas Online.
 Dawn Donalson, Buffalo Hump. <--Dead link, February 2016.

Bibliography
 Bial, Raymond. Lifeways: The Comanche. New York: Benchmark Books, 2000.
 Brice, Donaly E. The Great Comanche Raid: Boldest Indian Attack on the Texas Republic McGowan Book Co. 1987
 "Comanche" Skyhawks Native American Dedication (August 15, 2005)
 "Comanche" on the History Channel (August 26, 2005)
 Dunnegan, Ted. Ted's Arrowheads and Artifacts from the Comancheria (August 19, 2005)
 Fehrenbach, Theodore Reed The Comanches: The Destruction of a People. New York: Knopf, 1974, . Later (2003) republished under the title The Comanches: The History of a People
 Foster, Morris. Being Comanche.
 Frazier, Ian. Great Plains. New York: Farrar, Straus, and Giroux, 1989.
 John, Elizabeth and A.H. Storms Brewed in Other Men's Worlds: The Confrontation of the Indian, Spanish, and French in the Southwest, 1540–1795. College Station, TX: Texas A&M Press, 1975.
 Jones, David E. Sanapia: Comanche Medicine Woman. New York: Holt, Rinehart and Winston, 1974.
 Lodge, Sally. Native American People: The Comanche. Vero Beach, Florida 32964: Rourke Publications, Inc., 1992.
 Lund, Bill. Native Peoples: The Comanche Indians. Mankato, Minnesota: Bridgestone Books, 1997.
 Mooney, Martin. The Junior Library of American Indians: The Comanche Indians. New York: Chelsea House Publishers, 1993.
 Native Americans: Comanche  (August 13, 2005).
 Richardson, Rupert N. The Comanche Barrier to South Plains Settlement: A Century and a Half of Savage Resistance to the Advancing White Frontier. Glendale, CA: Arthur H. Clark Company, 1933.
 Rollings, Willard. Indians of North America: The Comanche. New York: Chelsea House Publishers, 1989.
 Secoy, Frank. Changing Military Patterns on the Great Plains. Monograph of the American Ethnological Society, No. 21. Locust Valley, NY: J. J. Augustin, 1953.
 Streissguth, Thomas. Indigenous Peoples of North America: The Comanche. San Diego: Lucent Books Incorporation, 2000.
 "The Texas Comanches" on Texas Indians (August 14, 2005).
 Wallace, Ernest, and E. Adamson Hoebel. The Comanches: Lords of the Southern Plains. Norman: University of Oklahoma Press, 1952.

Conflicts in 1840
1840 in the Republic of Texas
Battles involving the Comanche
Great Raid
Comanche tribe
Texas–Indian Wars
Massacres by Native Americans
August 1840 events